Ira Thedunna Manushyar is a 1981 Indian Malayalam film, directed by K. Sukumaran Nair. The film stars Madhu, Jayabharathi, Sathaar and Aranmula Ponnamma in the lead roles. The film has musical score by G. Devarajan.

Cast
Madhu
Jayabharathi
Sathaar
 Vincent
Aranmula Ponnamma
K. P. A. C. Azeez
Dhanya Vincent

Soundtrack
The music was composed by G. Devarajan and the lyrics were written by Bichu Thirumala and Chunakkara Ramankutty

References

External links
 

1981 films
1980s Malayalam-language films